The Building and Construction Industry Security of Payment Act 2002 was passed by the Australian State of Victoria to allow for the rapid determination of progress claims under building contracts or sub-contracts and contracts for the supply of goods or services in the building industry.  This process was designed to ensure cash flow to businesses in the building industry, without parties get tied up in lengthy and expensive litigation or arbitration.

Adjudication is much quicker than litigation in a court (an adjudicator's determination must be made within 10 days of receipt of application) and less expensive.  An adjudicator's determination is binding on the parties and can be recovered as a debt owing in a Court.

See also
 Building Adjudication Victoria Inc

External sources
 Building and Construction Industry Security of Payment Act 2002  (on AustLII)

Victoria (Australia) legislation
2002 in Australian law
2000s in Victoria (Australia)
Construction industry of Australia